The Disney Renaissance was the period from 1989 to 1999 during which Walt Disney Feature Animation returned to producing critically and commercially successful animated films that were mostly based on well-known stories, much as the studio did during the era of Walt Disney during the 1930s to 1960s. The resurgence allowed Disney's animated films to become powerhouse successes at the domestic and foreign box office, earning much greater profit than most of the Disney films of previous eras.

The animated films released by Disney during this period are: The Little Mermaid (1989), The Rescuers Down Under (1990), Beauty and the Beast (1991), Aladdin (1992), The Lion King (1994), Pocahontas (1995), The Hunchback of Notre Dame (1996), Hercules (1997), Mulan (1998), and Tarzan (1999).

In just ten years, Disney Renaissance films have received many awards and nominations. Nine of the ten films were nominated for Academy Awards, six of which won at least one Academy Award; six Best Original Song and five Best Original Score, with the first five films won awards in both categories. Disney Renaissance is also notable for being its film Beauty and the Beast became the first animated film ever to be nominated for Best Picture. Nine of the films were nominated for Annie Awards, with eight of them winning at least one, and five of them received Best Animated Feature.

Alan Menken has received most of the awards and nominations in his career thanks to Disney Renaissance.

Academy Awards 
The Rescuers Down Under is the only Disney Renaissance to not have an Academy Award nomination of any kind.

Golden Globe Awards

Grammy Awards

Annie Awards

Saturn Awards

References

External links 

 
 
 
 
 
 
 
 
 
 

 
Disney Renaissance